Pléguien (Gallo: Plégien) is a commune in the Côtes-d'Armor department of Brittany  in northwestern France. The number of housing of Pléguien was estimated at 630 in 2007. These accommodation of Pléguien consist of 466 main homes, 133 secondary residences and 31 vacant accommodation.

Population

Inhabitants of Pléguien are called pléguiénais in French.

See also
Communes of the Côtes-d'Armor department

References

External links

Communes of Côtes-d'Armor